Taygib Omarovich Tolboyev (8 August 1955 – 20 May 2021) was a Soviet and Russian test pilot.

Tolboyev was born on 8 August 1955 in the village of Sogratl, Gunibsky District, then part of the Dagestan Autonomous Soviet Socialist Republic, in the Russian SFSR, Soviet Union. He was the younger brother of Magomed Tolboyev, who also became a test pilot, and a Hero of the Russian Federation. Tolboyev joined the Soviet Armed Forces in 1974, serving in the Soviet Air Force. On 9 May 2007 he was awarded the title of Hero of the Russian Federation for courage and heroism shown during the testing of new models of aviation technology. In retirement he served as a deputy of the People's Khural of the Republic of Buryatia, for United Russia, between 2007 and 2013.

Tolboyev died in Sogratl on 20 May 2021, aged 65.

References

1955 births
2021 deaths
Soviet test pilots
People from Gunibsky District
Russian aviators
Deaths from cancer in Russia
Heroes of the Russian Federation
Recipients of the Order of Military Merit (Russia)